Trifurcula micromeriae is a moth of the family Nepticulidae. It is endemic to the Canary Islands.

The larvae feed on Micromeria teneriffae and Micromeria varia. They mine the leaves of their host plant. The mine consists of a slender corridor with a broad frass line. The larva mines in two to three leaves and moves from one leaf to another through the petioles.

External links
bladmineerders.nl
Fauna Europaea

Nepticulidae
Moths of Africa
Moths described in 1908